It Starts with Us is a romance novel by Colleen Hoover, published by Atria Books on October 18, 2022. It is the sequel to her 2016 best-selling novel It Ends with Us. The sequel was first announced in February 2022. It became Simon & Schuster's most pre-ordered book of all time. Hoover wrote the novel as a "thank you" to fans of the first novel.

Premise 
The novel continues from where It Ends with Us ended and centers on the relationship between Lily and Atlas. The novel alternates chapters between the first-person narration of Lily and Atlas.

Reception 
By the end of its release day, the novel sold 800,000 copies, a number that includes pre-orders and first-day sales. It Starts with Us debuted at number one on The New York Times fiction best-seller list for the week ending October 22, 2022.

In its starred review, Publishers Weekly called it a "stunning sequel" that showcases "the author's talent for creating nuanced and empathetic characters..." Kirkus Reviews wrote, "Through palpable tension balanced with glimmers of hope, Hoover beautifully captures the heartbreak and joy of starting over." Marianka Swain of The Daily Telegraph gave the novel 2 out of 5 stars, describing Hoover's writing quality as "closer to Fifty Shades of Grey, a strange mix of twee and graphic, plus the added irritant of solemn therapy-speak pronouncements." Swain also lamented, "She [Hoover] favours blunt dialogue and inner monologues over description, subtext or character development." Alice Giddings of Metro wrote, "While it doesn't have the grit or the emotional pain and catharsis of the first book, Colleen's latest work is exactly what it needs to be, which is the light at the end of the tunnel."

It Starts With Us was named W H Smith's Book of the Year for 2022.

References 

2022 American novels
American romance novels
Atria Publishing Group books
Contemporary romance novels
First-person narrative novels